Latvia participated at the 2010 Winter Olympics in Vancouver, British Columbia, Canada, with 58 athletes in 9 sports, which tied the biggest Latvian delegation to the Olympics ever.

At the Games, Haralds Silovs became the first athlete in Olympic games to participate in both short track (1500m) and long track (5000m) speed skating, and the first to compete in two different disciplines on the same day.

Bobsledder Jānis Miņins, who was among the favourites in four-man bobsleigh, missed the Olympics, because of an appendix surgery he went through, when he had already arrived in Canada just days before the Olympic start. He participated also in several trainings for the four-man event, but after crashing twice, decided not to start.

Medalists

Alpine skiing

Men

Women

Biathlon 

Men

Women

Bobsleigh 

Two-man

Four-man

Cross-country skiing 

Men

Women

Ice hockey

Men's tournament 

Roster

Group play 
Latvia played in Group B.
Round-robin
All times are local (UTC-8).

Standings

Final rounds 
Qualification playoff

Luge

Short track speed skating 

Men

Skeleton

Speed skating 

Men

References 

Nations at the 2010 Winter Olympics
2010
Winter Olympics